Flag of Hate is the first EP by German thrash metal band Kreator, released in 1986. It is also included on the 2000 reissue of the Pleasure to Kill album. US version included three bonus tracks—"Endless Pain", "Tormentor" and "Total Death"—all from Endless Pain. A less common reissue of Pleasure to Kill has all six as bonus tracks.

The song "Awakening of the Gods" was featured in the 2009 video game Grand Theft Auto IV: The Lost and Damned.

Track listing

Personnel
Mille Petrozza – guitars, vocals
Rob Fioretti – bass
Jürgen "Ventor" Reil – drums

References

External links
Kreator Terrorzone: Flag of Hate

Kreator albums
1986 debut EPs
Noise Records EPs
Thrash metal EPs